Close My Eyes can refer to:

Close My Eyes (film), the 1991 film written and directed by Stephen Poliakoff
Close My Eyes (album), the 2003 album by The Slackers
"Close My Eyes (Mariah Carey song), 1997
"Close My Eyes" (Sander van Doorn song), 2009